Miss Europe 2017 is an international beauty pageant, which was held on May 13, 2017 in Seoul, South Korea, where representatives of 35 countries were competing for the title of the first beauty. The crown and the title “Miss Europe 2017” was given to the contestant from Latvia, 26 years old Diana Kubasova. This was 60th edition of the Miss Europe pageant and the second under the Miss Europe Organization.

Background
The contestant from Germany Alena Senatorova got the title of first runner-up, and the representative from Ukraine Nina Gorinyuk, received the title of second runner-up. The new “Miss Europe 2017” Diana Kubasova was crowned by the last year's winner of the Miss Europe 2016 Diana Starkova from France with a valuable crown that's estimated worth is around 350,000 EUR. The crown is annually handed over to the winner of the Miss Europe contest since 2003.

The crown was created by a well known jewelry brand Chopard in 2003, specially for the Miss Europe contest. It has 678 diamonds set in 130 grams of white gold. It contains a rare dark centre/central diamond of 26.40 carats in the centre. Miss Europe 2017 title comes with a modeling contract and a professional representation by
the Miss Europe Organization, a cash prize, a tiara with 678 diamonds mounted on in 130 grams of gold signed by Chopard and estimated worth 350,000 EUR, diamond jewelry set matching to the crownby Chopard, a one-year supply of make up products and tools from YSL, a shoe collection from Christian Louboutin, swimwear by La Perla, an evening gown by Elie Saab, a year's worth of skincare products from Guerlain, skincare and hair products from Kerastase and many other gifts.
 
The new Miss Europe 2017 Diana Kubasova already has some previous experience in beauty contests. Diana was named SEXIEST WOMAN ALIVE 2013 by the most influential beauty pageant news portal Global Beauties. She was chosen among the 400 beauties who competed in the five Grand Slam pageants (Miss Universe, Miss World, Miss Supranational, Miss International and Miss Tourism Queen) in 2013. The FHM Latvia magazine has also placed her as one of the top five in their 100 Sexiest Women In The World list several years in the row. As a model she has worked with a big large number of international brands like Guess, Maison Margiela, Zadig & Voltaire, Jaeger Lecoultre, Adidas, Armine, Galvanni, etc.

Her passion is to study languages and she speaks 7 of them. She also studied in one if the best universities in Europe - Stockholm School of Economics where she received BSc degree in Financial Economics and Business. Now the lady successfully works as a model and her photos cover such magazines as FHM, Shape and others.

Shortly Diana Kubasova will go on her first trip as the Miss Europe 2017. The girl is invited to be a special guest on the red carpet of the Cannes Film Festival.

Both runners-up are invited to visit the Cannes Festival too. However, Diana Kubasova will be accompanied only by first runner-up of Miss Europe 2017 Alena Senatorova from Germany, and Miss Europe 2016 Diana Starkova from France.

And as for the second runner up of Miss Europe 2017 Nina Gorinyuk from Ukraine,
she will not go to Cannes this year, as among her prizes she has got received an English
study programme in Malta. Therefore, instead of the red carpet of the Cannes
Festival, the girl flies will fly to Malta, as she needs good command of English to
fulfill her duties of the second runner up of Miss Europe 2017, which enables
her to work as a model.

At the moment, the winners of the Miss Europe 2017 contest try on haute couture outfits from the famous fashion houses for the red carpet of the Cannes festival. Many designers are fighting for the opportunity to dress the most beautiful girls in Europe, as last year's winner of the contest Miss Europe 2016 26 year old Diana Starkova from France made a real sensation on the red carpet of Cannes last year when in she wore a dress from Elie Saab. After that, in Cannes, the girl was chosen as the face of the brand Dolce Gabbana. Then Diana Starkova was seen as Miss Europe 2016 on the red carpet of the Venice Film Festival, was shot for numerous advertising companies of famous brands and made many official trips.

The Miss Europe contest has been held since 1927 and for the first time the
representative of Latvia became its winner.

The most times Miss Europe competition has been won by representatives from France -  eight times, the last of which in 2016. The second in success are Germany and Spain, each of these countries won the Miss Europe competition seven times. At the moment the Miss Europe contest is considered the world's oldest beauty contest and one of the most prestigious one, as the winners receive the best modelling contracts, the opportunities to be the special guests on the red carpets of the most important film festivals in the world and much more.

Results

Placements

Contestants
Some of the delegates for Miss Europe 2017:

 - Lenty Frans
 - Halida Krajšnik
 - Angelica Zacchigna
 - UNKNOWN
 - UNKNOWN
 - UNKNOWN
 - Sonia Ait Mansour
 - Alena Senatorova
 - UNKNOWN
 - Arna Ýr Jónsdóttir
 - UNKNOWN
 - Diana Kubasova
 - UNKNOWN
 - UNKNOWN
 - Martha Fenech
 - Daniela Marin
 - Adela Zoranić
 - Christina Waage
 - Flávia Joana Gouveia Brito
 - Teodora Dan
 - UNKNOWN
 - Maja Taradi
 - Noelia Freire Benito
 - Tansu Sıla Çakır
 - Nina Gorinyuk
 - Ffion Moyle

References

External links
 

Miss Europe 2017